Antonio Senzatela Rondón (born January 21, 1995) is a Venezuelan professional baseball pitcher for the Colorado Rockies of Major League Baseball (MLB). He made his MLB debut in 2017.

Career

Minor leagues
The Colorado Rockies signed Senzatela as an amateur free agent and he began playing with the Dominican Summer League Rockies in 2012.

In 2014, MiLB.com named Senzatela as one of the Rockies' Organization All-Stars after he posted a 15–2 win–loss record with a 3.11 earned run average (ERA) for the Asheville Tourists of the Class A South Atlantic League, helping the team to win the league championship.

Prior to the 2015 season, he was named by MLB.com as the Rockies' 11th best prospect. The Rockies added Senzatela to their 40-man roster after the 2015 season.

In 2016, Senzatela pitched for the Hartford Yard Goats of the Class AA Eastern League.

Major leagues

2017
Senzatela made the Rockies' Opening Day roster in 2017 and he made his major league debut on April 6. Senzatela had a 3–1 win–loss record and a 2.81 ERA in five starts in April, and was named the National League's Rookie of the Month. After pitching to a 9–3 record and a 4.68 ERA in 88⅓ innings (15 starts), Senzatela was shifted to a relief pitcher in order to monitor his innings, due to him missing most of the 2016 baseball season due to various injuries. Senzatela finished the season with a 10–5 record in 36 games, 20 starts.

2018
Senzatela began the 2018 season as a relief pitcher for the Rockies. After 10 appearances, he was sent down to Colorado Springs. He was placed on the disabled list on July 12 with a blister injury. He finished the season with a 6–6 record in 23 games (13 starts).

2019
The following season, Senzatela won 11 games with a career worst 6.71 ERA in 25 starts. He struck out 76 batters in  innings.

2020
In 2020, Senzatela was 5–3 with a 3.44 ERA, and had the lowest strikeouts per nine innings ratio of all qualified NL pitchers (5.0).

2021
In 2021, he set career highs in starts (28), innings pitched and strikeouts (105), despite posting a record of 4–10 with a 4.42 ERA. Following the season, the Rockies signed Senzatela to a five-year contract extension worth $50.5 million.

2022
On April 23, 2022, in a game against the Detroit Tigers, Senzatela allowed Miguel Cabrera's 3,000th hit. The play was a single into right field. The Rockies would eventually lose 13–0. On August 18th, Senzatela left his start against the Cardinals with a left knee sprain. The next day, an MRI revealed a torn ACL which ended Senzatela's 2022 season.

Scouting report
Senzatela throws from a high three quarters release, relying on a  fastball, an  slider with cutting movement, and a changeup.

Personal life
Senzatela's mother, Nidya, died from stomach cancer in 2016. He is married.

References

External links

1995 births
Asheville Tourists players
Colorado Rockies players
Dominican Summer League Rockies players
Venezuelan expatriate baseball players in the Dominican Republic
Hartford Yard Goats players
Living people
Major League Baseball pitchers
Major League Baseball players from Venezuela
Modesto Nuts players
Navegantes del Magallanes players
People from Valencia, Venezuela
Tri-City Dust Devils players
Venezuelan expatriate baseball players in the United States